Mridula Varier is an Indian playback singer from Kerala. She started her career as a playback singer in the Malayalam movie Big B in 2007. She has also recorded songs for Tamil, Telugu and Kannada films. She was the winner of Kairali TV Gandharva Sangeetham in 2005 and the first runner-up of Idea Star Singer in 2010.

Early life and family

Mridula Varier was born to P. V. Ramankutty Varier and M. T. Vijayalakshmy in Kozhikode. At the age of four, she started learning music and participated in music contests with her brother Jaideep Varier. She completed her bachelor's degree in Electronics Engineering from KMCT College of Engineering in 2009.

Personal life

She married Dr. Arun Varier on 7 January 2013. She has a daughter named Maithreyi Varier born in June 2016 .

Career

Television contests
She started participating in television music contests right from school days. In 2004, she participated in Saptaswarangal, a musical contest on Asianet, and was awarded the first runner-up. In 2005, she participated in Onnam Raagam, a musical contest on Doordarshan and won the first prize. In 2010 she won 1st Runner Up title in season five of Idea Star Singer.

Reality shows

2004 - Sapthaswarangal on Asianet - 1st Runner Up.
2005 - Gandharvasangeetham on Kairali TV - Winner. 
2006 - Super Star on Amrita TV - 3rd Runner Up.
2007 - Star of Stars on Asianet Plus - Winner.
2010 - Idea Star Singer on Asianet - 1st Runner Up.
2022 - Top Singer (TV series) on Flowers- Judge

Awards
Kerala State Film Awards:
 2014 - Kerala State Film Awards Special Jury Award 2013 for Singing  (Movie : Kalimannu & Song : Laali Laali)

South Indian International Movie Awards:
 2014 - Best Female Playback Singer - Malayalam (Movie : Kalimannu & Song : Laali Laali)

Asianet Film Awards:
 2014 - Best Female Playback Singer 2013 for Kalimannu (Song-Laali Laali)

Vanitha Film Awards:
 2014 - Best Female Playback Singer 2013 for Kalimannu (Song-Laali Laali)

Other awards:
 2011 - Rotary Club of Calicut - Rotary Vocational Excellence Award for Music
 2012 - Aimfill - Inspire Film Awards - Best Female Singer 2012(Oh Marimayan ) for Ivan Megharoopan
 2013 - CACSS (Creative Arts and Cultural Service Sangam) Film Awards 2013 - Best Female Singer 2012 for 916 (film) and Ivan Megharoopan
 2013 - Nana Film Awards 2013 - Best Female Playback for Kalimannu 
 2014 - CERA BIG Malayalam Music Awards (92.7 BIG FM) - Most Promising Singer 2013 for Kalimannu and Vishudhan
 2014 - JaiHind TV Film Awards'14 - Best Female Singer for Kalimannu (Song-Laali Laali)
 2014 - Swaralaya-Eenam Awards'14
 2014 - Vayalar Ramavarma Film Awards'14 - Best Female Singer for Kalimannu (Song-Laali Laali)
 2014 - KANNUR VISION & SMARTSA CREATION PRESENTS MIR FILM AWARDS 2013 - Best Female Singer for Kalimannu (Song-Laali Laali)
 2014 - Amrita TV Film Awards'14 - Best Female Singer for Kalimannu (Song-Laali Laali)
 2015 - Expatriates Film and Arts Awards "EFA Awards 2015" - "Voice of the Year" for Best Singer of the year 2014.
 2017 - 3rd edition of Indywood Film Carnival 2017 "Best Singer-Female"
 2019 - Satyajit Ray Film Society International Short Film Awards "Best Singer-Female"
 2019 - ACV JOHNSON MUSIC AWARDS 2019 "Best Duet" for Ira (film) (Song-Oru Mozhi Oru Mozhi Parayam)
 2020 - Lions Club International District 318e Film Awards "Youth Icon-2020"

Discography

As composer

Albums

As Playback Singer

Malayalam

Tamil

Kannada

Telugu

TV serials

Albums

References

Living people
Indian women playback singers
Malayalam playback singers
Year of birth missing (living people)
Film musicians from Kerala
Musicians from Kozhikode
Singers from Kerala
21st-century Indian singers
21st-century Indian women singers
Women musicians from Kerala